Mehboob Rahi is a prominent poet of modern Urdu poetry. He also has a PHD on the life of another prominent Urdu poet, Muzaffar Hanfi, published in 1984, from Nagpur University.

Awards
Bal Sahitya Puraskar of Kendriya sahitya academy 2014

References

Year of birth missing (living people)
Urdu-language poets
Living people